WMBO (1340 kHz) is an AM radio station licensed to Auburn, New York, United States. The station serves the western Syracuse metropolitan area. The station is 51% owned by Craig Fox, who also owns several other radio and low-power TV stations in the state of New York.

History

WMBO signed on in 1927, initially broadcasting at 1310 AM.

As a result of the North American Regional Broadcasting Agreement, in 1941 the station was reallocated to its current frequency.

In 1998, the call sign changed to WKGJ. On May 3, 1999, WKGJ (alongside WOLF and WOLF-FM) became the Radio Disney affiliates in the Syracuse metropolitan area. The station later changed its call sign to WWLF in 2000.

In December 2013, WMBO dropped the WOLF simulcast and flipped to all-Beatles programming.

After carrying an all-Beatles stunt branded as WBTL for the first few months of 2014, the station is now simulcasting the "Dinosaur Radio" classic hits format originating from sister station WSEN.

References

External links
All-Christmas “Holly-FM” stunting changes to all-Beatles format - CNYRadio.com

MBO (AM)
Radio stations established in 1927
Classic hits radio stations in the United States
1927 establishments in New York (state)